Olcayto is a masculine Turkish given name. In Turkish "Olcayto" means "Luck", and/or "Lucky". Olcayto is the masculine version of "Olcay" which is a feminine Turkish given name (although it has been used as a male given name as well, as in footballer Olcay Şahan's name for instance).

People named Olcayto include:

People
 Olcayto Ahmet Tuğsuz, a Turkish singer, lyricist and composer. He has participated several times in the Eurovision Song Contest. At Eurovision 1978 he was a member of the group Nazar, that performed the song Sevince and scored just 2 points. In 1982 he composed Hani? for the singer Neco, (which scored 20 points) and in 1987 he composed and wrote the lyrics of Şarkım Sevgi Üstüne performed by Seyyal Taner & Lokomotif, which failed to score a single point. He returned to the contest in 2016 as the composer of San Marino's entry I Didn't Know performed by Serhat, which failed to qualify for the Eurovision Song Contest 2016 final.
 Olcayto (1280-1316), was the eighth Ilkhanid dynasty ruler in Iran from 1304 to 1316.
 Gazanfer Olcayto, former football player of Mersin İdmanyurdu.

Fictional characters
 Olcayto, protagonist of Hakanlar Çarpışıyor.

See also 

 Öljaitü

Turkish masculine given names